A list of Catholic churches in Ireland, notable current and former individual church buildings and congregations and administration of the Catholic Church in Ireland. These churches are listed buildings or have been recognised for their historical importance, or are church congregations notable for reasons unrelated to their buildings.

Churches
Sorted according to the counties of Ireland, with reference to the Catholic dioceses, which are in the ecclesiastical provinces of Armagh, Cashel, Dublin, Tuam.

Antrim 
In the Diocese of Down and Connor:
St Peter's Cathedral, Belfast
Clonard Monastery
St Malachy's Church, Belfast
St Mary's Church, Belfast
St Patrick's Church, Belfast

Armagh 
In the Archdiocese of Armagh:
 St Patrick's Cathedral, Armagh

Carlow
In the Diocese of Kildare and Leighlin:
 Cathedral of the Assumption, Carlow

Cavan
In the Diocese of Kilmore:
 Cavan Cathedral
 St Aidan's Church, Butlersbridge

Clare
In the Diocese of Killaloe:
 Ennis Cathedral

In the Diocese of Galway, Kilmacduagh and Kilfenora:
 St. Fachanan, Kilfenora

In the Diocese of Limerick:
 Church of St. John, Cratloe

Cork
In the Diocese of Cork and Ross:
 Cathedral of St Mary and St Anne
 Church of St Mary and St John, Ballincollig
 Holy Trinity Church, Cork (Capuchins)
 Honan Chapel
 Saints Peter and Paul's Church, Cork
 St. Mary's Dominican Church and Priory
 St. Patrick's Cathedral, Skibbereen

In the Diocese of Cloyne:
 St Colman's Cathedral, Cobh

Derry 
In the Diocese of Derry:
 St Eugene's Cathedral
 St Columba's Church, Long Tower

Donegal
In the Diocese of Raphoe:
 Cathedral of St Eunan and St Columba
 Church of the Irish Martyrs, Letterkenny
 St Columba's Church, Burtonport
 St Columba's Church, Glenswilly

In the Diocese of Clogher:
 St Patrick's Purgatory

Down 
In the Diocese of Dromore:
 Newry Cathedral

Dublin
In the Archdiocese of Dublin:
 St Mary's Pro-Cathedral
 Chapel Royal, Dublin
 Church of Our Lady of the Assumption, Ballyfermot
 Church of the Assumption, Booterstown
 Church of the Assumption, Howth
 Church of the Immaculate Conception, Dublin (Franciscan)
 Saint Francis Xavier Church, Dublin (Jesuit)
 John's Lane Church
 Mary Immaculate, Refuge of Sinners Church
 Newman University Church
 St. Assam's Church
 St Audoen's Church, Dublin
 St Andrew's Church, Westland Row, Dublin
 St James' Church, Dublin 
 St Mary's Church, Haddington Road, Dublin
 St Peter's Church, Phibsborough, Dublin
 St Catherine's Church, Dublin
 St. John the Baptist, Blackrock
 St. Joseph's Carmelite Church, Berkeley Road
 St. Joseph's Church, East Wall
 St. Kevin's Church, Harrington Street, Dublin
 St. Michan's Catholic Church, Dublin
 Church of St Nicholas of Myra Without
 St. Patrick's Church, Ringsend
 St. Paul's Church, Dublin
 Whitefriar Street Carmelite Church

Galway
In the Diocese of Galway, Kilmacduagh and Kilfenora:
 Cathedral of Our Lady Assumed into Heaven and St Nicholas, Galway
 St Ignatius Church, Galway (Jesuit)
 Kylemore Abbey (Benedictine)

In the Archdiocese of Tuam:
 Cathedral of the Assumption of the Blessed Virgin Mary, Tuam

In the Diocese of Clonfert:
 St Brendan's Cathedral, Loughrea
 St. Michael's Church, Ballinasloe

Kerry
In the Diocese of Kerry:
 St Mary's Cathedral, Killarney

Kildare
In the Diocese of Kildare and Leighlin:
 St. Anne's Church, Ardclough

In the Archdiocese of Dublin:
 St. Brigid's Church, Straffan

Kilkenny
In the Diocese of Ossory:
 St Mary's Cathedral, Kilkenny
 Black Abbey (Dominicans)
 Church of Saint John the Evangelist, Kilkenny

Leitrim
In the Diocese of Ardagh and Clonmacnoise:
 Costello Chapel

Limerick
In the Diocese of Limerick:
 St John's Cathedral (Limerick)

Longford
In the Diocese of Ardagh and Clonmacnoise:
 St Mel's Cathedral

Louth
In the Archdiocese of Armagh:
 St. Peter's Roman Catholic Church, Drogheda
 St. Patrick's Church, Dundalk

Mayo
In the Archdiocese of Tuam:
 Knock Shrine
 Ballintubber Abbey
 Claremorris church

In the Diocese of Killala:
 St Muredach's Cathedral, Ballina

Meath
In the Diocese of Meath:
 Silverstream Priory (Benedictine)
 St Mary's Church, Navan

Roscommon
In the Diocese of Achonry:
 Cathedral of the Annunciation of the Blessed Virgin Mary and St Nathy, Ballaghaderreen

In the Diocese of Elphin:
 Sacred Heart Church, Roscommon

Sligo
In the Diocese of Elphin:
 Cathedral of the Immaculate Conception, Sligo

Tipperary
In the Archdiocese of Cashel and Emly:
 Cathedral of the Assumption, Thurles
 St Ailbe's Church, Emly

In the Diocese of Killaloe:
 St. Cronan's Church, Roscrea

Tyrone 
In the Diocese of Derry:
 Sacred Heart Church, Plumbridge

Waterford
In the Diocese of Waterford and Lismore:
 Cathedral of the Most Holy Trinity, Waterford
 St Patrick's Catholic Church, Waterford

Westmeath
In the Diocese of Meath:
 Cathedral of Christ the King, Mullingar
 St Paul's Church, Mullingar

In the Archdiocese of Tuam:
 Church of Saints Peter and Paul, Athlone

Wexford
In the Diocese of Ferns:
 St. Aidan's Cathedral

Wicklow
In the Archdiocese of Dublin:
 Holy Redeemer Church, Bray

See also
 List of basilicas in Ireland
 List of monastic houses in Ireland

Further reading
 Seán D. O'Reilly, Irish Churches and Monasteries: An Historical and Architectural Guide, Collins Press, 1997.

Roman Catholic churches in Ireland
Lists of Roman Catholic churches
Lists of religious buildings and structures in Ireland